The Place Harvey Milk is a public square in Paris, France.
It lies at a junction in Le Marais, at the intersection of the Rue des Archives and the Rue de la Verrerie, at the heart of the French capital.

Access

The nearest métro station is Hôtel de Ville   .

The La Verrerie bus stop on RATP Bus Network line  is located on the square, which can also be reached by lines  at Place du Châtelet and Rue de Rivoli bus stops.

History 
In 2019, the Council of Paris decided to pay homage to the late San Francisco politician and pioneer of gay rights Harvey Milk. The square was inaugurated by local officials on June 19 of that year, in the presence of Milk's nephew Stuart Milk.

The same day, the city of Paris also honoured the American artist Gilbert Baker, gay rights activist, creator of the Rainbow Flag and friend of Harvey Milk, with an official plaque in his memory at the nearby Place des Émeutes-de-Stonewall.

Features
The square stands 100m from the Paris City Hall, the seat of the Council of Paris, whose members voted to pay tribute to their late counterpart from San Francisco, who was assassinated in November 1978. Looking from the place Harvey Milk towards the Hôtel de Ville, Notre-Dame-de-Paris can be seen in perspective.

One year prior to the renaming of the junction, rainbow zebra crossings in the vicinity, which had been painted to commemorate Paris Pride, were tagged with homophobic graffiti. In response, the city council made the rainbow crossings permanent. The naming of the junction after Harvey Milk was praised by anti-homophobia organizations.

An entrance to the famous department store Bazar de l'Hôtel de Ville stands at one corner of the square.

Gallery

See also

 Le Marais
 LGBT culture in Paris

References

External links
 
 

Squares in Paris
Tourist attractions in Paris
Le Marais
Harvey Milk